The Journal of Clinical Sleep Medicine is a monthly peer-reviewed medical journal covering sleep medicine. It was established in 2005 and is published by the American Academy of Sleep Medicine, of which it is the official journal. The editor-in-chief is Nancy A. Collop, MD (Emory University). According to the 2022 Journal Citation Reports, the journal's Impact Factor for 2021 is 4.324, and its 5-year Impact Factor is 5.593.

References

External links

Sleep medicine journals
Academic journals published by learned and professional societies of the United States
Monthly journals
Publications established in 2005
English-language journals